Source Input Format (SIF) defined in MPEG-1, is a video format that was developed to allow the storage and transmission of digital video. 

 625/50 SIF format (PAL/SECAM) has a resolution of (360 or) 352 x 288 active pixels and a refresh rate of 25 frames per second.
 525/59.94 SIF Format (NTSC) has a resolution of (360 or) 352 x 240 active pixels and a refresh rate of 29.97 frames per second.

When compared to the CCIR 601 specifications, which defines the appropriate parameters for digital encoding of TV signals, SIF can be seen as being reduced by half in all of height, width, frame-rate, and chrominance.  SIF video is known as a constrained parameters bitstream.

The computer industry has defined square-pixel SIF to be 320 x 240 (QVGA) or 384 x 288 active pixels with a refresh rate of whatever the computer is capable of supporting.

See also 
Common Intermediate Format (CIF)

References 

Graphics standards
MPEG